Oswould Hitchcock (9 September 1859 – 13 July 1948) was an Australian cricketer. He played in six first-class matches for Queensland between 1894 and 1897.

See also
 List of Queensland first-class cricketers

References

External links
 

1859 births
1948 deaths
Australian cricketers
Queensland cricketers
Cricketers from New South Wales
Queensland cricket captains